Thresh may refer to:

Threshing, in agriculture
Threshing machine
A minor character in the novel The Hunger Games and its film adaptation
Thresh (gamer), handle of esports player Dennis Fong

See also
 Thrash (disambiguation)
 Thresher (disambiguation)